The 1956 Iowa Hawkeyes football team was an American football team that represented the University of Iowa in the 1956 Big Ten Conference football season. The Hawkeyes were champions of the Big Ten Conference and beat the Oregon State Beavers in the 1957 Rose Bowl, a rematch of a regular season game.

The team's statistical leaders included quarterback Ken Ploen with 386 passing yards, Ploen with 487 rushing yards, Ploen with 873 total yards, and Jim Gibbons with 255 receiving yards. Tackle Alex Karras was selected as a first-team All-American.

Schedule

Roster

 Rose Bowl Media Guide

Rankings

Game summaries

Indiana

On September 29, 1956, Iowa defeated Indiana, 27–0, before a crowd of 25,000 at Memorial Stadium in Bloomington, Indiana. Iowa scored two touchdowns in the first quarter off an Indiana fumble and an interception. Iowa rushed for 242 yards to 76 yards for Indiana.

Oregon State

On October 6, Iowa (ranked No. 20 in the AP Poll) defeated Oregon State, 14–13, before a crowd of 41,027 at Iowa Stadium in Iowa City.  The game matched the same teams that met again in the 1957 Rose Bowl. Oregon State scored on its second play from scrimmage on a 30-yard pass, but the extra point attempt was blocked.  Oregon State scored again in the third quarter on a 49-yard run by Paul Lowe and led, 13–0, at the start of the fourth quarter. Iowa threw two touchdown passes in a span of six minutes in the fourth quarter to secure the victory.

Wisconsin

On October 13, Iowa defeated Wisconsin, 13–7, before a crowd of 53,273 at Iowa Stadium. With only a minute remaining in the first half, Iowa drove 84 yards, running eight plays in 59 seconds and scoring on a pitchout from Ken Ploen to Mike Hagler. Iowa scored again on the first drive of the second half on a short run by Ploen, taking a 13–0 lead.

Hawaii

On October 20, Iowa defeated Hawaii, 34–0, at Iowa Stadium in Iowa City. Iowa led, 14–0, at halftime and played second, third and fourth-string players in the second half, with a total of 42 Hawkeyes seeing game action. Iowa rushed for 266 yards and held Hawaii to 67 rushing yards.

Purdue

On October 27, Iowa (ranked No. 12 in the AP Poll) defeated Purdue, 21–20, before a crowd of 41,415 at Ross–Ade Stadium in West Lafayette. Purdue quarterback Len Dawson threw two touchdown passes, and Mel Dillard ran for a third. Iowa also scored three touchdowns, with the difference being a missed extra point. Purdue drove into Iowa territory late in the game, but Purdue fumbled at the 25-yard line with a minute and a half remaining in the game.

Michigan

On November 3, Michigan (ranked No. 17 in the AP Poll) defeated Iowa (ranked No. 7 in the AP Poll) by a 17–14 score before a crowd of 58,137 at Iowa Stadium in Iowa City. The loss was the only one of the year for Iowa. Iowa had not beaten Michigan since 1924. Michigan took a 3–0 lead in the first quarter on a field goal by Ron Kramer. Iowa then scored two touchdowns and led, 14–3, at halftime. One of the Iowa touchdowns was set up when Michigan's quarterback was sacked and fumbled with Alex Karras recovering the ball for Iowa. Michigan's third-string halfback, Mike Shatusky, scored two touchdowns in the second half, a three-yard run in the third quarter and a two-yard plunge with one minute and six seconds remaining in the game.

Minnesota

On November 10, Iowa (ranked No. 15 in the AP Poll) defeated Minnesota (ranked No. 6), 7–0, before a crowd of 64,235 at Memorial Stadium in Minneapolis. Iowa coach implemented a 6-3-2 defense to contain Minnesota's speedy Bobby Cox. After the game, Cox noted: "I couldn't go outside. They forced me to go inside and then some linebacker would nail me." The outcome put Iowa into the lead in the race for the conference's Rose Bowl bid.  After the game, Iowa's players carried coach Evashevski off the field on their shoulders.

Ohio State

On November 17, Iowa (ranked No. 7 in the AP Poll) defeated Ohio State (ranked No. 6), 6–0, before a crowd of 57,732 at Iowa Stadium. Ohio State went into the game with the second best rushing attack in the country but were held to 147 rushing yards, their lowest rushing yardage total in two years. The result broke Ohio State's winning streak of 17 games against conference opponents and clinched for Iowa the conference championship and a berth in the Rose Bowl.  After time expired, Iowa fans hauled down the goal posts and paraded through Iowa City.

Notre Dame

On November 24, Iowa (ranked No. 3) defeated Notre Dame, 48–8, before a crowd of 56,632 at Iowa Stadium.  The victory, combined with Ohio State's loss, gave Iowa its first undisputed Big Ten championship since 1922. Iowa's 48 points was the fourth highest total allowed by a Notre Dame football team to that point in the program's history. Paul Hornung sprained a thumb 10 minutes into the game and did not return. Iowa rushed for 409 yards and scored on runs of 10 and 41 yards by Ken Ploen, 23 and 61 yards by Fred Harris, and 54 yards by Mike Hagler.

Rose Bowl

    
    
    
    
    
    
    
    

On January 1, 1957, Iowa defeated Oregon State, 35–19, in the 1957 Rose Bowl. Iowa scored five touchdowns, including a 49-yard touchdown run by Ken Ploen and a 66-yard touchdown run by Collins Hagler.

Postseason awards

Three Iowa players were picked by the Associated Press (AP) and/or the United Press (UP) as first-team players on the 1956 All-Big Ten Conference football team.  They were:

Karras also received first-team honors on the 1956 College Football All-America Team from the Associated Press, the Football Writers Association of America, and the Central Press.

On December 3, 1956, both the Associated Press (AP) and United Press (UP) released their final college football polls. Both organizations ranked undefeated Oklahoma at the No. 1 spot with Iowa at No. 3.

On December 4, 1956, the Heisman Trophy was awarded to Paul Hornung of Notre Dame. Iowa quarterback Ken Ploen placed ninth in the voting.

On December 16, 1957, Iowa quarterback Ken Ploen received the Chicago Tribune Silver Football trophy as the most valuable player in the Big Ten.

1957 NFL Draft

References

Iowa
Iowa Hawkeyes football seasons
Big Ten Conference football champion seasons
Rose Bowl champion seasons
Iowa Hawkeyes football